Jefferson is a borough in York County, Pennsylvania, United States. The population was 655 at the 2020 census. The post office serving Jefferson is called Codorus.

Geography
The town is named for Thomas Jefferson.

Demographics

As of the census of 2000, there were 631 people, 253 households, and 191 families residing in the borough. The population density was 1,036.4 people per square mile (399.4/km2). There were 261 housing units at an average density of 428.7/sq mi (165.2/km2). The racial makeup of the borough was 99.52% White, 0.16% African American, and 0.32% from two or more races. Hispanic or Latino of any race were 0.32% of the population.

There were 253 households, out of which 30.8% had children under the age of 18 living with them, 64.4% were married couples living together, 9.1% had a female householder with no husband present, and 24.5% were non-families. 22.5% of all households were made up of individuals, and 10.3% had someone living alone who was 65 years of age or older. The average household size was 2.49 and the average family size was 2.92.

In the borough the population was spread out, with 24.1% under the age of 18, 7.4% from 18 to 24, 26.6% from 25 to 44, 28.2% from 45 to 64, and 13.6% who were 65 years of age or older. The median age was 39 years. For every 100 females there were 105.5 males. For every 100 females age 18 and over, there were 102.1 males.

The median income for a household in the borough was $43,542, and the median income for a family was $49,028. Males had a median income of $37,313 versus $27,031 for females. The per capita income for the borough was $19,070. About 1.1% of families and 1.7% of the population were below the poverty line, including none of those under age 18 and 5.4% of those age 65 or over.

Fire protection
Jefferson Borough is served by the Jefferson Volunteer Fire Company (Station 47) as well as the surrounding mutual aid departments, including Spring Grove Fire Department, North Codorus Fire Department, Seven Valleys Fire Department, Porters Community Fire Company, and Lineboro Fire Department (MD).

Emergency Medical Services
Jefferson is primarily covered by Spring Grove Ambulance service, which occasionally has Advanced Life Support (ALS) capabilities for EMS needs.  The Jefferson Fire Department also has a Quick Response Service (QRS), that responds to provide Basic Life Support (BLS) care to patients until the arrival of a transport unit.

Other organizations that may provide EMS to this jurisdiction if Spring Grove is unavailable, including when they lack ALS coverage, includes the Lineboro Volunteer Fire Department (ALS), Community LifeTeam EMS, Pleasant Hill Fire Company (BLS), and other surrounding organizations.

Closest hospitals include UPMC Hanover Hospital, Wellspan York Hospital, and UPMC Memorial Hospital.

References

External links

Populated places established in 1812
Boroughs in York County, Pennsylvania
1866 establishments in Pennsylvania